Patrick Henry Duff (May 6, 1875 – September 11, 1925) was an American professional baseball player. Duff played one game in Major League Baseball, and in one at bat he didn't compile a hit. Despite his limited playing time in the majors, Duff's minor league career spanned eight nonconsecutive seasons.

Early life
Duff was born in Providence, Rhode Island on May 6, 1875, though 1890 United States Census records suggests he was born in 1876. His father, Patrick Duff, was born in Ireland in 1830, and worked as a laborer. Duff's mother was also from Ireland. Duff attended Manhattan College from 1901–1904.

Professional career
In 1897, Duff began his professional career with the Class-B Fall River Indians of the New England League. With the Indians, Duff got no hits in 3 at-bats. Duff played with the Class-F New Haven Blues, and the Class-F Norwich Witches of the Connecticut State League in 1901 after a three-year absence in professional baseball. He batted .260 with 82 hits, 14 doubles, 6 triples, 7 home runs, and 20 stolen bases that season. On the season, Duff was tied for sixth in the league in home runs along with Thomas Ivers, and Bob Unglaub. The next season, Duff again played for the New Haven Blues, and the Norwich Witches, however, his stats for that season were not kept. Duff also played for the Class-A Syracuse Stars of the Eastern League in 1901, but did not play. In 1904, Duff played for the All-Americans of the Cuban League playing first base on a team that included multiple major leaguers.

After another three-year absence from pro-baseball, Duff played for the Class-AA Minneapolis Millers, and the Class-AA Indianapolis Indians of the American Association in 1905. In 22 games that season, Duff batted .176 with 13 hits, and 3 doubles. In 1906, Duff played his only season in Major League Baseball with the Washington Senators. In only 1 games, Duff did not get a hit in 1 at-bat. The next season, Duff played for the Class-B York White Roses/Reading Pretzels, and the Class-B Johnstown Johnnies of the Tri-State League. In 100 games that season, Duff batted .204 with 68 hits, and 11 doubles, 3 triples, and 1 home run. In 1908, Duff played for the Class-B New Bedford Whalers, and the Lowell Tigers of the New England League. He batted .243 with 99 hits, 13 doubles, 1 triple, and 1 home run in 117 games. Duff played the 1909 season with the Class-B Haverhill Hustlers, and the Class-B Brockton Tigers of the New England League. In 78 games, Duff batted .226 with 60 hits, 8 doubles, 3 triples, and 1 home run. Duff's final season in professional baseball came in 1910 when he was at the age of 35. In 13 games with the Class-D Norwich Bonbons/Meriden Doublins of the Connecticut Association, Duff batted .357 with 15 hits.

Later life
Duff died in Providence, Rhode Island on September 11, 1925 at the age of 50. He was buried St. Ann Cemetery in Cranston, Rhode Island.

References

External links

1875 births
1925 deaths
Baseball players from Providence, Rhode Island
Sportspeople from Providence, Rhode Island
Major League Baseball catchers
Major League Baseball first basemen
Washington Senators (1901–1960) players
Fall River Indians players
Pawtucket Tigers players
New Haven Blues players
Norwich Witches players
Indianapolis Indians players
Minneapolis Millers (baseball) players
Johnstown Johnnies players
York White Rozes players
Reading Pretzels players
Lowell Tigers players
New Bedford Whalers (baseball) players
Brockton Tigers players
Haverhill Hustlers players
Norwich Bonbons players
Meriden Doublins players
Manhattan Jaspers baseball players
Providence Friars baseball coaches
American people of Irish descent
Plattsburgh (baseball) players